Tamegroute (also spelled Tamgrout; Berber: ⵜⴰⵎⴳⵔⵓⵜ , Arabic: تامكروت) is a village located in the Draa River valley in southern Morocco. It historically served as a hub of learning and religion through its famous Sufi zawiya. This was a historical center of the Nasiriyya order, one of the most influential (and at one time one of the largest) Sufi orders in the Islamic world. Tamegroute's glazed ceramics are also very well known.

Climate

Zawiya Nasiriyya/Naciria

History

Tamegroute has been a religious center since the 11th century. The Nasiriyya zawiya was founded in the 17th century as the seat of the religious (Sufi) brotherhood of the Nasiriyya.  Tamegroute had a religious school made famous by Abu Hafs Umar b. Ahmed al Ansari in 1575–76. The Nasiriyya order took its name (and its reputation) from founder Sidi Muhammad bin Nasir al-Drawi (1603–1674), who took over teaching at the Tamegroute zawiya in the 1640s. Since that time the leaders of the zawiya have been descendants of bin Nasir without interruption from father to son until the present day. Sidi Muhammad bin Nasir was a theologian, scholar and physician, especially interested in mental disorders. He wrote several works of fikh, some poetry, and hundreds of letters and treatises on Islamic law. He followed and extended the teachings of Shadhili and under his leadership the Nasiriyya became the 'mother zawiya' of Sufi Islam in the Maghreb with several branches in different parts of the country, including the zawiya of Irazan in the Sous valley where 500 students were financed by the brotherhood.

He was succeeded by his son Ahmad (1647–1717) who made six pilgrimages to Mecca and made each of these pilgrimages into a journey of several years. Sidi Ahmad bin Nasir traveled to Ethiopia, Arabia, Egypt, Iraq and Persia. During his travels he took the opportunity of establishing new branches of the Sufi brotherhood. He wrote a voluminous series of memoirs of his journeys called the Rihla (partly translated by A. Berbrugger in 1846) and he brought back numerous works from all parts of the Islamic world. The brotherhood decided, already in the 17th century to found a university of the Quran. That university received, right from the beginning, more than 1,500 students from countries in the Middle-East and West Africa.

When Ahmad bin Nasir died, the library (in Arabic the 'khizana habsia') of Tamegroute, with its thousands of manuscripts was one of the richest of North Africa. Some fine examples of the collection of manuscripts (now 4,200) are still on display in the zawiya today and attract many tourists from Morocco and abroad. Among them are a 14th-century Quran with beautiful calligraphy in Kufic script, writings of Avicenna (Ibn Sina), Ibn Rushd (Averroes), El Khwarizmi, a translation of Pythagoras, treatises on theology, astronomy, geography and pharmacology. 
Later sheikhs of the Sufi brotherhood of the  Nasiriyya also played an important role as religious and cultural leaders and teachers of the Sufi doctrine (Tasawwuf). The 19th sheikh Abu Bekr is well-known, in the Draa valley (zawiya in Mhamid Ghuslan) and in the west through his encounters with the travelers Gerhard Rohlfs and Charles de Foucauld. The graves of eight marabouts attract the visit of patients from all parts of the country, some of which remain in Tamegroute for months and sometimes even for years, hoping for healing and redemption by the baraka of the Nasiriyya. In order to view the books at the library, a permit must be obtained from the Moroccan government, which allows you to handle the books inside the library only. The books collected by Ali Ben include texts on medicine, Qu'ranic learning and astrology, as well as mathematics and the sciences.

The building of the zawiya, as it stands now with its green tiles, dates from 1869, when it was rebuilt after a fire.

Moussem
A month after the greatest Islam holy day of Aid el-Kebir, Tamegroute hosts the yearly Moussem (festival) honoring Sidi Muhammad bin Nasir.

Pottery

The founders of the religious brotherhood Nasiriyya wanted to raise the status of the village of Tamegroute to that of a "Medina", that is to say to make it a city. They assembled the merchants and craftsmen that they had brought from Fes, a city that enjoyed good relations with Tamegroute at the time. However, today Tamegroute is a little village again, but the pottery has become its main characteristic. Except for a few ochre shades, a green glaze is the dominant colour in pottery from Tamegroute. As with Fes Zelliges, and even more so, the ancient techniques give the glaze infinite variations.

Local institutions
The outdoor weekly market (souk) is held on Saturdays in the city center, where you can admire all kinds of pottery

Muhammad Awzal
In the 17th century the famous Shilha (Berber) poet, Muhammad Awzal (1670–1748), found sanctuary in Tamegroute. His first work in Berber al-Hawd was written here. His last work An-Nasiha ("The Advice"), is an ode in praise of Sidi Ahmad ibn Muhammad ibn Nasir (1647–1717), Awzal's spiritual guide and grand master of the Nasiriyya Sufi order, probably inspired as a funeral eulogy by his death, around 1717. Another famous inhabitant of Tamegroute was Sidi Ahmad al-Tijani who joined the order of the Nasiriyya before establishing his own brotherhood.

Abu-l-Hasan Ali Ibn Mohammed al-Tamgruti
Tamegroute was the place of birth of one of the most important officials of the Saadian court, the author and ambassador Abu-l-Hasan Ali Ibn Mohammed al-Tamgruti, best known because of the rihla of his journey to Istanbul in 1590–91 for Ahmad al-Mansur

Bibliography and external links
 Ph.D. Thesis: "Between God and men : the Nasiriyya and economic life in Morocco, 1640–1830" by David Gutelius. Johns Hopkins University, 2001.
 The Nasiriyya - Abstract from David Gutelius' dissertation, "Market Growth and Social Change in the Western Maghrib, 1640-1830."
 Article: The path is easy and the benefits large: The Nasiriyya, social networks and economic change in Morocco, 1640–1830, from: The Journal of African History, Gutelius, David P.V.,  01-Jan-02 
 Book chapter: "Sufi networks and the Social Contexts for Scholarship in Morocco and the Northern Sahara, 1660-1830" by David Gutelius.  In "The Transmission of Learning in Islamic Africa ed. Scott Reese.  Leiden: Brill Academic Press, 2004.
Agriculture, Sufism and the State in Tenth/Sixteenth-Century Morocco, by Francisco Rodriguez-Manas, Bulletin of the School of Oriental and African Studies, University of London, Vol. 59, No. 3 (1996), pp. 450–471 
The Nasiri supplication 
Example of a manuscript (from Timbouctou) in the library of the Nasiryya 
 Dalil Makhtutat Dar al Kutub al Nasiriya, 1985 (Catalog of the Nasiri zawiya in Tamagrut), (ed. Keta books)
See also: Darqawa and Nasiriyya (Sufism)
"the 19th century was the Darqawi century, just as the 18th century had been the Nasiri century"

Footnotes

Populated places in Zagora Province
Sufi shrines